Giacomo Ciera was a Roman Catholic prelate who served as Bishop of Chiron (1406–?).

Biography
On 1 Mar 1406, Giacomo Ciera was appointed during the papacy of Pope Innocent VII as Bishop of Chiron. It is uncertain how long he served. While bishop, he was the principal co-consecrator of Antonio Correr, Bishop of Modon (1407).

See also
Catholic Church in Greece

References

15th-century Roman Catholic bishops in the Republic of Venice
Bishops appointed by Pope Innocent VII